Mehul Nisar is an Indian television and film actor. He started his career with the 1998 television series Hip Hip Hurray. He has acted in more than 25 television shows and has appeared in more than 100 television commercials.

Career
Mehul Nisar started his career with the TV series Hip Hip Hurray in 1998, and has acted in many more television shows since then. He has had a long association with Rajshri Films, working with them on Pyaar Ke Do Naam: Ek Raadha, Ek Shyaam, Woh Rehne Waali Mehlon Ki and Yahan Main Ghar Ghar Kheli.

In 2006 he appeared in an American television film titled The Curse of King Tut's Tomb.

Filmography

Television 
 1999 - Hip Hip Hurray
 2000 - Titliyan
 2000 - Apna Apna Style
 2001 - Hip Hip Hurray 2
 2002 - Par Is Dil Ko Kaise Samjaye
 2002 - Kehta Hai Dil
 2002 - Ssshhhh...Koi Hai
 2003 - Aahat
 2003 - C.I.D.
 2004 - Raat Hone Ko Hai
 2004 - Pyaar Ki Kashti Mein
 2005 - Hey...Yehii To Haii Woh!
 2005 - Woh Rehne Waali Mehlon Ki
 2005 - Hotel Kingston
 2005 - Dekho Magar Pyaar Se
 2006 - Pyaar Ke Do Naam: Ek Raadha, Ek Shyaam
 2006 - Tumhari Disha
 2007 - Jabb Love Hua
 2008 - Mata Ki Chowki
 2008 - Jiya Jale
 2008 - Rubi
 2009 - Yahan Main Ghar Ghar Kheli
 2010 - Jaane Pehchaane Se... Ye Ajnabbi
 2011 - Chidiya Ghar
 2014 - Kaisi Yeh Yaariaan
 2016 - Bahu Hamari Rajni Kant
 2018 - Qayamat Ki Raat
 2020-2021 - Anupamaa
 2021 - Santoshi Maa - Sunayein Vrat Kathayein
 2022 - Kabhi Kabhie Ittefaq Sey
 2022–present Palkon Ki Chhaon Mein 2

Films 
 2000 - Mohabbatein
 2006 - The Curse of King Tut's Tomb

References

External links

Living people
Indian male television actors
Male actors in Hindi cinema
Male actors in Hindi television
Indian male film actors
People from Solapur
Year of birth missing (living people)